Muktainagar is one of the 288 Vidhan Sabha (Assembly) constituencies of the Maharashtra state in Western India. It is one of the eleven Vidhan-Sabha constituencies of Jalgaon district. It is part of the Raver (Lok Sabha constituency), along with five other assembly constituencies, namely, Chopda, Raver, Bhusaval, Jamner Assembly constituency, and Malkapur.

Chandrakant Nimba Patil is the current MLA from the constituency.

Members of the legislative assembly

Election results

See also
Muktainagar

References

Assembly constituencies of Maharashtra
Jalgaon district
Jalgaon
Maharashtra